Velindopsis is a genus of beetles in the family Carabidae, containing the following species:

 Velindopsis madecassa Jeannel, 1949
 Velindopsis panagaeoides Burgeon, 1937
 Velindopsis pauliani Basilewsky, 1953

References

Lebiinae